Castor Creek may refer to:

Castor Creek (Little River), a stream in Louisiana
Castor Creek (Battle River), a stream in Alberta, Canada

See also
Castor River (disambiguation)